Bellotto is a surname, which may refer to:
 Antonio "Tony" (Carlos Liberalli) Bellotto (born 1960), a Brazilian musician (guitarist) and writer
 Bernardo Bellotto (1720 - 1780), a Venetian landscape painter or vedutista, and printmaker
 Ettore Bellotto (1895 - 1966), an Italian gymnast
 Niko Bellotto, an Argentine solo electronic musician
 Pietro Bellotto can refer to one of two painters
 Pietro Bellotti (1625–1700) Baroque portrait painter from Venice and Bolzano.
 younger brother of Bernardo Bellotto, a second Pietro Bellotto (1725-c. 1805) was a Venetian vedute painter, active for years in France

 Sam Bellotto science fiction writer editor and developer of Crossdown software.

Italian-language surnames